The 1980 Denver Broncos season was the team's 21st year in professional football and its 11th with the National Football League (NFL). Led by fourth-year head coach Red Miller the Broncos were 8–8, tied for third in the AFC West (fourth via tiebreaker), and missed the playoffs for the first time in four seasons.

It was Miller's final season; ownership changed in February 1981 and front office changes were made in March.

Offseason

NFL draft

Personnel

Staff

Roster

Regular season

Schedule

Game summaries

Week 10

Standings

References

External links
Denver Broncos – 1980 media guide
1980 Denver Broncos at Pro-Football-Reference.com

Denver Broncos
Denver Broncos seasons
Denver Bronco